Hindolo Sumanguru Trye (died 26 July 2012) was a Sierra Leonean politician with the All People's Congress (APC). Prior to his death, he was Sierra Leone's Minister of Tourism and Cultural Affairs.

External links
http://www.afdevinfo.com/htmlreports/peo/peo_41448.htm

Year of birth missing
2012 deaths
Tourism in Sierra Leone
All People's Congress politicians
Government ministers of Sierra Leone